William Arthur Watts (26 May 1930 – 26 April 2010) was a Professor in Botany at and - (later) Provost of - Trinity College Dublin.

He was born in Dublin's docklands and studied Modern Languages at Trinity, where he was elected a Scholar in 1950, graduating in 1952 and in Natural Sciences the following year.

He became a fellow of Trinity in 1960, Reader in Botany in 1964, Professor in 1966 and Provost from 1981 to 1991.

He was President of the Royal Irish Academy from 1982 to 1986.

References

1930 births
2010 deaths
Fellows of Trinity College Dublin
20th-century Irish botanists
Presidents of the Royal Irish Academy
Provosts of Trinity College Dublin
Scholars of Trinity College Dublin